EKOS Research Associates Inc. is a Canadian social and economic research company founded by Carleton University graduate Frank Graves. They specialize in market research, public opinion research, strategic communications advice, program evaluation and performance measurement, and human resources and organizational research. Their main headquarters is in Ottawa, Ontario, and they have another centre in Toronto, Ontario.

EKOS is a member of MRIA, the Marketing Research and Intelligence Association, and was a longstanding member of MRIA's predecessor, The Canadian Association of Marketing Research Organizations.

The president of EKOS is Frank Graves.

EKOS uses interactive voice response (IVR) for its political polls and to recruit for its research panel, known as Probit.

References

External links
EKOS homepage
EKOS Politics
MRIA homepage
Probit.ca

Public opinion research companies
Market research companies of Canada
Companies based in Ottawa